The Peter Kiewit Institute is a facility in Omaha, Nebraska, United States which houses academic programs from the University of Nebraska–Lincoln College of Engineering.

Founded in 1996 in partnership with the University of Nebraska–Lincoln, the University of Nebraska Omaha, and companies in the private sector, PKI's goal is "to help meet the needs of the nation's technology and engineering firms by providing a top-flight education to students interested in pursuing careers in information science, technology and engineering."

The Holland Computing Center, which houses the Firefly supercomputer, is located inside the institute.

Colleges
 College of Information Science and Technology – University of Nebraska at Omaha
 College of Engineering – University of Nebraska – Lincoln

Degrees offered

Information Science and Technology

From the University of Nebraska at Omaha:
Bachelor's
Computer Science
Management Information Systems
Bioinformatics
Cybersecurity
IT Innovation
Master's
Computer Science
Management Information Systems
Cybersecurity
PhD
Information Technology

Engineering

From the University of Nebraska-Lincoln:
 Architectural Engineering
 Civil Engineering
 Computer Engineering
 Construction Engineering
 Construction Management
 Electrical Engineering

References

External links
Peter Kiewit Institute website

University of Nebraska Omaha
Schools in Omaha, Nebraska